The Williams Rocks are a group of islands, being essentially rocks located  north of Flat Islands and Holme Bay, off the coast of Mac. Robertson Land. The Williams Rocks were mapped by Robert G. Dovers of the ANARE in 1954. The Williams Rocks were named by the ANCA for J. Williams, assistant diesel mechanic at Mawson Station in 1962, who assisted in a triangulation of the Williams Rocks and the erection of a beacon.

See also 
 Composite Antarctic Gazetteer
 List of Antarctic islands south of 60° S
 SCAR
 Territorial claims in Antarctica

References

External links 

Islands of Mac. Robertson Land